Aphanopleura is a genus of flowering plants in the family Apiaceae. It is endemic to Asia.

Species
Aphanopleura capillifolia
Aphanopleura fedtschenkoana
Aphanopleura leptoclada
Aphanopleura trachysperma
Aphanopleura zangelanica Gogina & Matsenko

References

Apioideae
Taxa named by Pierre Edmond Boissier
Apioideae genera